Hnahlan is a border town in the Champhai Rural Development Block of Champhai district of Mizoram state in India.

Demographics 

According to the 2011 census of India, Hnahlan has 569 households. The effective literacy rate (i.e. the literacy rate of population excluding children aged 6 and below) is 92.95%.

Economy and border haat trade 

Hnahlan is one of the 4 Border Haats (markets) in Mizoram, others being at Sangau, Vaphai (Saikhumphai) and Zote, all of which boost the local trade and economy. Hnahlan is one of the largest grapes producing area in the region.

Transport and connectivity 

Zokhawthar (75 km south) provides connectivity to India–Myanmar–Thailand Trilateral Highway (IMT), and Asian Highway Network and Asian Highway 1 (AH1). Lengpui Airport in Aizawl (260 km west) is the nearest airport in India. Sairang railhead of Bairabi–Sairang line 270 km west is the nearest railway station.

See also 

 Borders of India

References 

Villages in Champhai block